Sartor tucuruiense is a species of headstander endemic to Brazil. 
It is found in the Tocantins River basin in Brazil.

References

Garavello, J.C. and H.A. Britski, 2003. Anostomidae (Headstanders). p. 71-84. In R.E. Reis, S.O. Kullander and C.J. Ferraris, Jr. (eds.) Checklist of the Freshwater Fishes of South and Central America. Porto Alegre: EDIPUCRS, Brasil.

Anostomidae
Fish of Brazil
Endemic fauna of Brazil
Taxa named by Geraldo Mendes dos Santos
Taxa named by Michel Louis Arthur Marie Ange François Jégu
Fish described in 1987